Othmar Blumer (10 August 1848 – 25 April 1900) was a Swiss politician and President of the Swiss Council of States (1896/1897).

External links 
 
 

1848 births
1900 deaths
Members of the Council of States (Switzerland)
Presidents of the Council of States (Switzerland)